Capilla de los Dolores (Grado) is a church in Grado, Asturias, in northern Spain. The chapel is listed as a historical monument.

See also
Asturian art
Catholic Church in Spain

References

Churches in Asturias
Roman Catholic chapels in Spain